The 2018 U.S. Virgin Islands gubernatorial election took place on November 6, 2018, to select the Governor of the United States Virgin Islands. The election was held concurrently with the 2018 United States midterm elections. Since no candidate received a majority of the General Election vote, as required by the Revised Organic Act of the Virgin Islands, a runoff was held 14 days later between Albert Bryan Jr. and Incumbent Governor Kenneth Mapp, the top two vote-getters. On November 20, 2018, Democrat Albert Bryan Jr. won the runoff with 54.5% of the vote.

The incumbent Governor Kenneth Mapp ran for reelection to a second term as an Independent politician with incumbent Lt. Gov. Osbert Potter. Mapp faced off against former Virgin Islands Labor Commissioner Albert Bryan Jr., who won the August 4 Democratic primary; Bryan earned 39.23% of the vote in the primary, defeating Allison "Allie" Petrus (33.67%) and Angel E. Dawson Jr. (26.68%). Also on the November ballot were Adlah "Foncie" Donastorg, Warren Mosler, Soraya Diase Coffelt, Moleto A. Smith, and Janette Millin Young.

On Election Day, November 6, Bryan earned 38.08% of the vote, with Mapp coming in second with 33.45%. In the November 20 runoff, Bryan was elected governor with 54.54% of the vote to Mapp's 45.15%.

Democratic primary

Candidates

Won primary
 Albert Bryan, former Labor Commissioner 
 Running mate: Tregenza Roach, territorial senator

Defeated in primary
 Allison “Allie” Petrus, former territorial senator 
 Running mate: Sammuel Sanes, territorial senator
 Angel Dawson Jr., former Finance Commissioner
 Running mate: Marise James

Results

General election

Endorsements

Polling

 2018 VIDE Schools Mock Election Results

Results

References

External links
Albert Bryan (D) for Governor

Gubernatorial
United States Virgin Islands